András Szalai (born 3 February 1998) is a Hungarian football player who currently plays for Dunaharaszti MTK.

Career

Paks
On 13 August 2016, Szalai played his first match for Paks in a 1-3 loss against Budapest Honvéd FC in the Hungarian League.

Club statistics

Updated to games played as of 16 December 2018.

References

External links

1998 births
Living people
Footballers from Budapest
Hungarian footballers
Hungarian expatriate footballers
Hungary youth international footballers
Association football defenders
Vasas SC players
MTK Budapest FC players
Paksi FC players
Dorogi FC footballers
KFC Komárno players
Balmazújvárosi FC players
Dunaharaszti MTK players
Nemzeti Bajnokság I players
Nemzeti Bajnokság II players
2. Liga (Slovakia) players
Hungarian expatriate sportspeople in Slovakia
Expatriate footballers in Slovakia